Melaleuca nanophylla, commonly known as dwarf-leaved honey-myrtle is a rare plant in the myrtle family, Myrtaceae and is endemic to two small areas, one in Western Australia and the other in South Australia. It has tiny leaves with their upper surfaces pressed against the stems and small heads of white or pale yellow flowers.

Description 

The flowers are white to creamy yellow and are arranged in small heads between the leaves.

Taxonomy and naming
The specific epithet (nanophylla) is from the Ancient Greek words nânos meaning “dwarf” and phýllon for “leaf” referring to the small leaves of this melaleuca.

Distribution and habitat
Melaleuca nanophylla occurs in the Emu district in South Australia. In Western Australia it is found in the  Van Linden Lakes area in the Gibson Desert biogeographic region. It grows near clay pans, in soils containing gypsum or chalk and in sandy clay.

Conservation
Melaleuca nanophylla is listed as a "Priority Three" by the Government of Western Australia Department of Parks and Wildlife meaning that it is poorly known and known from only a few locations but is not under imminent threat.

References

Flora of South Australia
nanophylla
Myrtales of Australia
Rosids of Western Australia
Plants described in 1979